Hejrat Boulevard is a boulevard in central Shiraz, Iran. It connects Atlasi (Qa'em) Square to Shahrdari Square.

Streets in Shiraz